JMC may refer to:
Jacobs Medical Center, a hospital at the University of California San Diego
Jaffna Municipal Council,  the local council for Jaffna, Sri Lanka
Jamal Mohamed College, a five star status autonomous college at Tiruchirappalli in India
James Madison College, a residential public affairs college at Michigan State University
Jamaica, ITU country code
Jammu Municipal Corporation
Jason Michael Carroll, a country music singer
Jason McRoy, a professional mountain bike racer from the UK
Jerusalem Music Centre, a music education centre in Jerusalem
J. M. Coetzee, South African-Australian writer
The Jesus and Mary Chain, a Scottish rock band
Jesus and Mary College, New Delhi
Jesus Miracle Crusade
Jiangling Motors Corporation, Jiangling Motors, an automobile manufacturer in China. 
John McCain, an American politician
John McGlashan College, an integrated composite boys' school in Dunedin, New Zealand
John Muir College, a residential college at the University of California San Diego
Joint Maritime Course, a UK military exercise
Joint Mathematical Council of the UK
Joint Ministerial Committee, between ministers of the UK Government, Scottish Executive, Welsh Assembly Government and Northern Ireland Executive
Jose Mari Chan, Filipino singer
Junior Mathematical Challenge, a challenge for students aged between 11 and 13, organised by the United Kingdom Mathematics Trust
Jupiter Mining Corporation, a fictional space mining company from the television programme Red Dwarf
JMC Air, a British charter airline
Joint Munitions Command
JRun Management Console
Journal of Medicinal Chemistry
Journal of Materials Chemistry
 Japan Collection of Microorganisms
U.S. Army Joint Modernization Command 
JDK Mission Control
Arani Srinivasulu, also known as Jangalapalli Srinivasulu and JMC, Indian politician